Forssan Ice Hall is an indoor ice hockey sports venue in Forssa, Finland.

References

Forssa
Indoor arenas in Finland
Indoor ice hockey venues in Finland